Sushany is a village (selo) in western Russia, located in Klimovsky District of Bryansk Oblast.

Geography 
The village is located in southwestern Bryansk Oblast, in the Polesian Lowland. It is near to Russia's state border with Ukraine.

History 
On 2 March 2023, at around 11:30 MSK, armed men identifying themselves as the "Russian Volunteer Corps"  attacked Lyubechane and Sushany. Ukraine called the attack a provocation.

Demographics 
From 2010 to 2013, the population of the settlement decreased from 200 to 180.

According to the 2002 Russian census, Russians made up 96% of the population, which at the time was 269.

References 

Populated places in Klimovsky District